The Military ranks of Central African Republic are the military insignia used by the Central African Armed Forces. Being a Landlocked country, the Central African Republic does not have a navy.  Being a former colony of France, Central African Republic shares a rank structure similar to that of France.

Commissioned officer ranks
The rank insignia of commissioned officers.

Other ranks
The rank insignia of non-commissioned officers and enlisted personnel.

References

External links
 

Central African Republic